Esteban Efraín Paredes Quintanilla (born 1 August 1980) is a Chilean former footballer who played as a forward.

Paredes is the first player to be five-time Primera División de Chile top goalscorer and has scored 286 league goals in his career, highlighting his 217–Primera División de Chile goals record which allowed him to be the all time top goalscorer of Chilean first-tier tournaments history. On October 5, 2019, he achieved the record surpassing Francisco Valdés in a 3–2 win over Universidad de Chile in the Chilean Superclásico.

Club career
He began his career at Santiago Morning youth ranks and was promoted in 2000.

In 2009, he joined Chilean giants Colo-Colo on a three-year contract. That season, Paredes was an influential player and helped the team to win the Torneo Clausura. He was a key player in the final against Universidad Católica, scoring twice past Universidad Católica goalkeeper Paulo Garcés.

In May 2022, after playing for Coquimbo Unido in the Chilean Primera División, and having scored 367 goals in his career, he announced his retirement as a professional footballer.

International career
Paredes represented his country in two World Cups, in 2010 and 2014 respectively, and at the 2011 Copa América.

Personal life
His son, Esteban Paredes Lastra, was with the Colo-Colo youth ranks and then moved to Palestino when his father left Colo-Colo.

In August 2022, he joined TNT Sports Chile as the co-host of the cooking and talk show Sabor a Gol alongside the chef Tomás Olivera.

Career statistics

International
Scores and results list Chile's goal tally first.

Honours

Club
Puerto Montt
 Primera B: 2002

Santiago Morning
 Primera B: 2005

Colo-Colo
 Primera División: 2009–C, 2014–C, 2015–A, 2017–T
 Copa Chile: 2016, 2019
 Supercopa de Chile: 2017, 2018

Coquimbo Unido
 Primera B: 2021

Individual
 Primera B de Chile Top Scorer: 2005
 Primera División de Chile Top Scorer (5): 2009–A, 2011–C, 2014–C, 2014–A, 2015–C
 El Gráfico Ideal Team (4): 2009, 2011, 2014, 2015
 ANFP Golden Ball Ideal Team (3): 2011, 2014, 2015
 ANFP Golden Ball Golden Boot: 2011
Liga MX Golden Boot (Shared): 2012–A
 El Gráfico Golden Boot: 2014
 ANFP Golden Ball Best Player: 2015
 Copa Chile Top Scorer (2): 2015, 2016
 El Gráfico Best Copa Chile Player: 2016

References

External links

1980 births
Living people
Footballers from Santiago
Chilean footballers
Chile international footballers
Santiago Morning footballers
Puerto Montt footballers
Universidad de Concepción footballers
Pachuca Juniors footballers
Cobreloa footballers
Colo-Colo footballers
Atlante F.C. footballers
Querétaro F.C. footballers
Coquimbo Unido footballers
Chilean expatriate footballers
Expatriate footballers in Mexico
Chilean expatriate sportspeople in Mexico
Chilean Primera División players
Primera B de Chile players
Liga Premier de México players
Liga MX players
2010 FIFA World Cup players
2011 Copa América players
2014 FIFA World Cup players
Association football forwards